Malus baccata is an Asian species of apple known by the common names Siberian crab apple, Siberian crab, Manchurian crab apple and Chinese crab apple. It is native to much of northern Asia, but is also grown elsewhere as an ornamental tree and for rootstock. It is used for bonsai. It bears plentiful fragrant white flowers and edible red to yellow fruit of about  diameter.

Description

They have arching or overhanging red-brown branches and red-brown buds. Leaves are elliptic or egg-shaped, . Flowering occurs in spring, with fruits appearing in September–October.

Taxonomy
The subordinate taxa include the followin varieties:
Malus baccata var. baccata ( tall) – China, Korea, Russia, Mongolia
Malus baccata var. daochengensis
Malus baccata var. gracilis – Gansu and Shaanxi in China
Malus baccata var. himalaica
Malus baccata var. jinxianensis
Malus baccata var. mandshurica (Manchurian crab apple)
Malus baccata var. xiaojinensis

Distribution and habitat 
The tree is found in Japan, and it has also been introduced to Europe and to North America, where it is found in the wild mostly in the Great Lakes Region and in the Northeastern United States.

Uses 
The species is used as ornament for its flowers and fruit. The fruits are edible and are eaten fresh or dried. It is one of the tallest and most resistant to cold and pest species of its genus, and is thus used for experimental breeding and grafting of other crabapples and domesticated apples. In particular, it is a common genetic source for M. pumila and M. asiatica in northern and north-eastern China. M. baccata var. mandshurica is used for bonsai.

See also
Applecrab

References

External links
line drawing, Flora of China Illustrations vol. 9, fig. 77, 1-3 
photo of herbarium specimen at Missouri Botanical Garden, collected in Missouri in 1970
University of Florida Fact Sheet
Plants for a future

baccata
Crabapples
Flora of temperate Asia
Flora of the Indian subcontinent
Plants described in 1767